Coryanthes mastersiana is a species of orchid found in Colombia and Ecuador.

References

External links

mastersiana
Orchids of Colombia
Orchids of Ecuador